Tiskupan (also Romanized as Ţīskūpān; also known as Tiazkupān, Tīkūkhān, and Tīskūfān) is a village in Kambel-e Soleyman Rural District, in the Central District of Chabahar County, Sistan and Baluchestan Province, Iran. At the 2006 census, its population was 529, in 101 families.

References 

Populated places in Chabahar County